This is an incomplete list of finance ministers of Egypt. Each minister's name is followed by the date when he took office.

Ministers of Finance (Kingdom of Egypt)

Ministers of Finance (Arab Republic of Egypt)

See also
 Ministry of Finance
Economy of Egypt
Cabinet of Egypt

References

 
Finance